Waray-Waray may refer to:
 Waray people
 Waray language
 Waray-Waray gangs

Language and nationality disambiguation pages